Listed below are Magistrates of the Magistrates Court of the Australian Capital Territory, including Chief Magistrates, Magistrates and Special Magistrates.

Prior to 1949, the person holding the office of Police Magistrate at either Queanbeyan or Goulburn exercised the power of Magistrate in the Australian Capital Territory.

Notes

References 

Judges
 
Magistrates Court of the Australian Capital Territory
Australian magistrates